A spread is a food that is spread, generally with a knife, onto foods such as bread and crackers. Spreads are added to food to enhance the flavor or texture of the food, which may be considered bland without it. Butter and soft cheeses are typical spreads.

A sandwich spread is a spreadable condiment used in a sandwich, in addition to more solid ingredients. Butter, mayonnaise, prepared mustard, and ketchup are typical sandwich spreads, along with their variants such as Thousand Island dressing, tartar sauce, and Russian dressing.

Spreads are different from dips, such as salsa, which are generally not applied to spread onto food but have food dipped into them instead. 

Common spreads include dairy spreads (such as cheeses, creams, and butters, although the term "butter" is broadly applied to many spreads), margarines, honey, nut-based spreads (peanut/cashew/hazelnut butter, Nutella), plant-derived spreads (such as jams, jellies, and hummus), yeast spreads (such as Vegemite and Marmite), and meat-based spreads (such as pâté).

See also
 Cheese spread
 List of spreads
 List of dips
 Lists of foods
 Peanut butter
 Shortening

References

External links